Bangladesh is among two South Asian teams, the other being India, to have participated in the AFC Asian Cup. Having qualified to the main phase of the tournament successfully on their first attempt, during the 1980 AFC Asian Cup, held in Kuwait. They failed to win any of their 4 games during the tournament. Kazi Salahuddin and Ashrafuddin Chunnu are the only goal scorers for Bangladesh in the competition.

This was the nations only appearance in the AFC Asian Cup to date and since the late 90s, the country's football has seen a massive deterioration, failing to produce talented players like they did in the late 70s and early 90s.

Overall Record

1980 Asian Cup

The county's first opposition was Asian giants North Korea. Regardless of coming into the game as huge underdogs, the team played decent attacking football against the Koreans. Bangladesh conceded two goals in a row in the 44th and 45th minutes of the match, both due to  blunders from goalkeeper Wahiduzzaman Pintu and the defense. Despite the letdown, the team kept on pressing and following a quick counter attack after winning the ball back from the Korean defense, Bangladesh earned a penalty. Kazi Salahuddin scored the country's first ever major tournament goal from the penalty spot in the 60th minute. However, the Koreans did not let the celebrations last long, when they scored again in the 88th minute after goalkeeper Pintu spilled the ball, leaving an empty net for the Koreans to score in. This did not stop Bangladesh from going on the attack again, and after making a great run, Ashrafuddin Ahmed Chunnu cut inside to score, making the score-line 3-2. In the end, Bangladesh were not able level the game, even so, they showed great spirit to take on a very strong North Korean team that had qualified for the World Cup only a few years before. During their second game, held three days later, against Syria, Bangladesh played with a defensive tactic. In the 7th minute of the match, Syrian striker Jamal Keshek scored a goal to give the team the lead. However, Bangladesh had numerous opportunities to equalize, which in the end they failed to do. Even so, during the game the country displayed a organized defensive performance, though they lacked quality going forward.

During their third game, Bangladesh were outplayed by defending champions Iran, and were trashed 7-0. Within 35 minutes into the game, Bangladesh fell 3 goal behind. Their plan of taking Iran head-on failed, as the team were dominated in the midfield during the first-half. Bangladesh managed to keep out Iran, for the majority of the second half, however, the oppositions constant attacking pressure had the Bangladeshi defense exhausted, leading to Behtash Fariba scoring from a corner in the 80th minute. Iran scored again within 2 minutes of the restart, when Fariba again found the net from close range, subsequently completing his quadruple of goals. The last match of the group-stage, saw Bangladesh conceding 6 against China. Hattricks from Shen Xiangfu and Xu Yonglai ended the nations AFC campaign on a disappointing note. However, even though the team failed to win a single game during the entirety of the competition, their performances on the field was fairly satisfactory, considering this was the country's first ever major tournament appearance, only 4 years after the Bangladesh Football Federation was founded.

Group A

Record by Opponent

Goalscorers

References

External links
YouTube: Bangladesh v North Korea (1980 AFC Asian Cup)
YouTube: Bangladesh v Syria (1980 AFC Asian Cup)
YouTube: Bangladesh v Iran (1980 AFC Asian Cup)

Bangladesh national football team
Countries at the AFC Asian Cup